Cauce is a surname. Notable people with the surname include:

Ana Mari Cauce (born 1956), American psychologist and college administrator
Elīza Cauce (born 1990), Latvian luger

See also
Caunce